The Georgetown Hospital is a community hospital located in the Georgetown area of Halton Hills, Ontario. It is part of the Halton Healthcare Services group of hospitals.

Services
The hospital provides the following services and procedures:
Medical and Surgical Services
procedures involving general surgery, gynaecology, orthopaedics, ENT and urology
long-term patient care
Supportive Housing
nurses and workers provide support to seniors living in designated apartments

The emergency department is open 24 hours a day, seven days a week, and provides service to more than 35,000 patients annually.

This hospital should not be confused with Georgetown Hospital in Georgetown, Ascension Island.

References

External links
Halton Health Care Services

Hospital buildings completed in 1961
Hospitals in Ontario
Buildings and structures in the Regional Municipality of Halton
Hospitals established in 1961
Heliports in Ontario
Halton Hills
Certified airports in Ontario